C. hystrix may refer to:
 Castanopsis hystrix, a tree species
 Citrus hystrix, the kaffir lime, a fruit tree species native to Indochinese and Malesian ecoregions

See also 
 Hystrix (disambiguation)